The 2023 PGA Tour Champions season is the 43rd season of the PGA Tour Champions, a golf tour for men age 50 and over. The tour officially began in 1980 as the Senior PGA Tour.

Schedule
The following table lists official events during the 2023 season.

See also
PGA Tour Champions awards
PGA Tour Champions records

Notes

References

PGA Tour Champions seasons
PGA Tour Champions
PGA Tour Champions